"The Power of Love" is a song written by Gary Nicholson and Don Cook, and recorded by American country music artist Charley Pride.  It was released in May 1984 as the first single from his album Power of Love.  The song peaked at number 9 on the Billboard Hot Country Singles chart.

Chart performance

Lee Roy Parnell version

"The Power of Love" was also recorded by American country music artist Lee Roy Parnell. It was released in October 1994 as the fourth single from his album On the Road. Parnell's version peaked at number 51 on the Billboard Hot Country Singles chart.

Chart performance

References

1984 singles
1994 singles
Charley Pride songs
Lee Roy Parnell songs
RCA Records singles
Arista Nashville singles
Songs written by Don Cook
Song recordings produced by Norro Wilson
Song recordings produced by Scott Hendricks
Songs written by Gary Nicholson
1984 songs